Kurşunlu District is a district of the Çankırı Province of Turkey. Its seat is the town of Kurşunlu. Its area is 609 km2, and its population is 8,463 (2021).

Composition
There is one municipality in Kurşunlu District:
 Kurşunlu

There are 26 villages in Kurşunlu District:

 Ağılözü 
 Başovacık 
 Bereket 
 Çatkese 
 Çaylıca 
 Çırdak
 Çukurca 
 Dağören 
 Demirciören 
 Dumanlı 
 Eskiahır 
 Göllüce 
 Hacımuslu 
 Hocahasan 
 İğdir 
 Kapaklı 
 Kızılca 
 Köpürlü 
 Madenli 
 Sarıalan 
 Sivricek 
 Sumucak 
 Sünürlü 
 Taşkaracalar
 Yeşilören 
 Yeşilöz

References

Districts of Çankırı Province